Gingerbeer may refer to:

 Ginger beer, a drink
 Gingerbeer (web community), a London-based web community for lesbians and bisexual women